The 1901–02 international cricket season was from September 1901 to April 1902.

Season overview

December

England in Australia

January

England in the West Indies

References

International cricket competitions by season
1901 in cricket
1902 in cricket